Banda Nkwanta Mosque is located in the West Gonja District in the formally Northern region of Ghana. It is now in the Savannah region. Banda Nkwanta is a small town along the intersection of the Bui Dam road and the Wa-Techiman highway.

History 
The mosque was built in the 18th century by Muslims who migrated south from Sudan. According to historians, the Muslims first entered Africa through Egypt in the 10th century AD and spread throughout the west and south during the gold trade and trans-Saharan slave routes.

Features 
It is built with mud in the Sudano-Sahelian architectural style. The mosque is very tall and it is said to have the tallest towers among the mud mosques in Ghana. The eastern tower of the mosque is about 42 feet high. It also has higher parapets It is rectangular in shape with timber-frame structures and pillars which gives support to the roof. It has two pyramidal towers and a number of buttresses. It has pinnacles which stick out above the parapet.

References 

18th-century mosques
Savannah Region (Ghana)
Mosques in Ghana
Sudano-Sahelian architecture